The European route E89 is a road part of the International E-road network, running from Gerede in Turkey to Ankara in Turkey.

It is a Class A North-South connection road connecting Gerede - Kizilcahamam - Ankara  (according to the UNECE).

Route 

: Gerede - Ankara
: Ankara

External links 
 UN Economic Commission for Europe: Overall Map of E-road Network (2007)

89
E089